Hannoa kitombetombe is a species of plant in the Simaroubaceae family. It is endemic to the Democratic Republic of the Congo.  It is threatened by habitat loss.

References

Endemic flora of the Democratic Republic of the Congo
kitombetombe
Vulnerable plants
Taxonomy articles created by Polbot